Madonna and Child with Saints is a common theme in Christian art, and is thus the title of a number of works.

Two saints 
 Madonna and Child with St Dominic and St Thomas Aquinas (Fra Angelico)
 Madonna and Child with Two Saints (Bicci) – Saints Blaise and Michael
 Madonna and Child with Michael the Archangel and St Andrew (Cima da Congeliano)
 Virgin and Child with Saints and Donors (Cima da Conegliano) – Saint Anthony Abbot and a female saint
 Virgin and Child with Saints (attributed to Cima) – Saints John the Evangelist (probably) and Nicholas
 Madonna and Child with Saints Elizabeth and John the Baptist (Correggio)
 Madonna and Child with Saints Francis and Quirinus (Correggio)
 Madonna and Child with Saints and Donor (Carlo Crivelli) – Saints Francis and Bernardino
 Madonna and Child with the Infant St John the Baptist and Saint Barbara (Daniele da Volterra)
 Madonna and Child with Saints Julian and Lawrence (Gentile da Fabriano)
 Madonna and Child with St. John the Baptist and St. Mary Magdalene (Neroccio di Bartolomeo de' Landi)
 Madonna and Child with St Michael and St Bernardino (Neroccio di Bartolomeo de' Landi)
 The Virgin and Child with Saint Anne and Saint John the Baptist (Leonardo da Vinci)
 Madonna with Child and Saints (Filippino Lippi) – Saints Martin and Catherine
 Madonna with Child between Sts. Flavian and Onuphrius (Lorenzo Lotto)
 The Madonna Enthroned (Master Martin) – Saints Catherine and Elizabeth of Hungary
 Madonna and Child with Saint Catherine of Alexandria and Saint Barbara (Master of Hoogstraeten)
 Virgin and Child with Saints Barbara and Catherine (Quentin Matsys)
 Madonna and Child with Saint James and Saint Dominic (Hans Memling)
 Madonna and Child with Two Saints (Pisanello) – Saints Anthony Abbot and George
 Madonna and Child with Saint Dominic and Saint Martha of Bethany (Andrea Previtali)
 Madonna and Child with Saint Sebastian and Saint Vincent Ferrer (Andrea Previtali)
 Madonna and Child with Saints Luke and Catherine of Alexandria (Titian)
 The Virgin and Child with Saint George and Saint Dorothy (Titian)
 Madonna and Child with Saint Jerome and Saint Dorothy (Francesco Vecellio)

Three saints 
 Madonna and Child with Saints (Agostino Carracci) – a bishop saint and Saints Margaret, John the Baptist and Cecilia
 Madonna and Child with Saints (Annibale Carracci, 1588) – Saints Francis, Matthew and John the Baptist
 Madonna and Child with Saints (Annibale Carracci, 1593) – Saints John the Baptist, John the Evangelist and Catherine

Four saints 
 Madonna and Child with Four Saints and Donor (Giovanni Bellini) – Saints John the Baptist, Francis, Jerome and Sebastian
 Madonna and Child with Angels and Saints (Filippo Lippi) – Saints Augustine, Ambrose, Gregory and Jerome
 Madonna and Child with Saints (Lotto) – Saints Peter, Francis and two others
 Madonna and Child with Saints (Signorelli, Arezzo) – Saints Stephen, Jerome and two bishop saints
 Madonna and Child with Saints (Tintoretto) – Saints Catherine, Augustine, Mark and John the Baptist
 Madonna and Child with Saints (Veronese) – Saints Elizabeth, Catherine and John the Baptist

Five saints 
 Madonna and Child with Saints Polyptych (Duccio) – Saints  Agnes, John the Evangelist, John the Baptist and Mary Magdalene
 Madonna and Child with Saints (Moretto, Verona) – Saints Catherine, Lucy, Cecilia, Barbara and Agnes
 Pucci Altarpiece (Pontormo) – Saints Jerome, Joseph, John the Baptist, Francis and John the Evangelist
 Virgin and Child with Saint Anne and Four Saints (Pontormo) – Saints Anne, Peter, Benedict, Sebastian and the Good Thief

Six saints 
 Madonna and Child with Saints (Mantegna) – Saints John the Baptist, Catherine and four others
 Madonna and Child with Saints (Marracci) – Saints Paulinus, Lucy, Philip Neri, Anthony Abbot, Anthony of Padua and Elizabeth of Hungary
 Virgin and Child with Saints (van der Weyden) – perhaps six saints
 Madonna and Child with Saints (circle of Giovanni Bellini) – Sebastian, Francis, John the Baptist, Jerome, unidentified female saint, Anthony of Padua

Seven saints 
 Madonna and Child with Saints (Moretto, London) – Saints Catherine, Clare, Jerome, Joseph, Bernardino, Francis and Nicholas

Eight saints 
 Madonna and Child with Eight Saints (Bramantino)

See also 
 Sacra conversazione
 Madonna and Child with Saints (Cima) (disambiguation)